Mark Green  (28 March 1917 – 2 August 2009) was the suffragan Bishop of Aston from 1972 to 1982. He was born into an ecclesiastical family and educated at Rossall School and Lincoln College, Oxford. He studied for ordination at Ripon College Cuddesdon before a curacy at St Catherine's Gloucester. After World War II service as a chaplain to the Forces he held incumbencies at Hull and Acaster Malbis. He was then Rural Dean of Ainsty before elevation to the episcopate. He retired in 1982.

References

1917 births
2009 deaths
People educated at Rossall School
Alumni of Lincoln College, Oxford
Alumni of Ripon College Cuddesdon
Recipients of the Military Cross
Bishops of Aston
British Army personnel of World War II
Royal Army Chaplains' Department officers
20th-century Church of England bishops
World War II chaplains